The 1983 US Open was a tennis tournament played on outdoor hard courts at the USTA National Tennis Center in New York City in New York in the United States. It was the 103rd edition of the US Open and was held from August 30 to September 11, 1983.

The event was marred by the death of linesman Dick Wertheim from blunt cranial trauma after an errant serve by Stefan Edberg struck his groin, causing him to fall and hit his head.

Seniors

Men's singles

 Jimmy Connors defeated  Ivan Lendl 6–3, 6–7(2–7), 7–5, 6–0
 It was Connors's 8th and last career Grand Slam title, his 5th US Open title and his 100th ATP single title.

Women's singles

 Martina Navratilova defeated  Chris Evert 6–1, 6–3
 It was Navratilova's 20th career Grand Slam title and her 1st US Open title.

Men's doubles

 Peter Fleming /  John McEnroe defeated  Fritz Buehning /  Van Winitsky 6–3, 6–4, 6–2
 It was Fleming's 6th career Grand Slam title and his 3rd and last US Open title. It was McEnroe's 12th career Grand Slam title and his 6th US Open title.

Women's doubles

 Martina Navratilova /  Pam Shriver defeated  Rosalyn Fairbank /  Candy Reynolds 6–7(4–7), 6–1, 6–3 
 It was Navratilova's 21st career Grand Slam title and her 5th US Open title. It was Shriver's 5th career Grand Slam title and her 1st US Open title.

Mixed doubles

 Elizabeth Sayers /  John Fitzgerald defeated  Barbara Potter /  Ferdi Taygan 3–6, 6–3, 6–4
 It was Sayers' 1st career Grand Slam title and her 1st US Open title. It was Fitzgerald's 2nd career Grand Slam title and his 1st US Open title.

Juniors

Boys' singles

 Stefan Edberg defeated  Simon Youl 6–2, 6–4

Girls' singles

 Elizabeth Minter defeated  Marianne Werdel 6–3, 7–5

Boys' doubles

 Mark Kratzmann /  Simon Youl defeated  Patrick McEnroe /  Brad Pearce 6–1, 7–6

Girls' doubles

 Ann Hulbert /  Bernadette Randall defeated  Natasha Reva /  Larisa Savchenko 6–4, 6–2

References

External links
 Official US Open website

 
 

 
US Open
US Open (tennis) by year
US Open
US Open
US Open
US Open